"In Spite of All the Danger" is the first song recorded by the Quarrymen, then consisting of John Lennon, Paul McCartney, George Harrison, pianist John Lowe, and drummer Colin Hanton.

McCartney wrote the song and Harrison provided the guitar solo, and so the song is credited to McCartney–Harrison. Recording took place sometime between May and July 1958 at Percy Phillips' home studio in Liverpool.

Composition and structure
Paul McCartney wrote the song on his own, likely around January 1958 and possibly at George Harrison's family home in Upton Green. The song uses the B7 chord, which McCartney discovered with Harrison after a multi-bus trip across Liverpool to the home of a stranger who knew the chord. Harrison wrote both of the song's guitar solos, and so McCartney gave him a joint credit. In The Beatles Anthology, McCartney describes it as, "a self-penned little song very influenced by Elvis [Presley]." In an interview with Beatles historian Mark Lewisohn, McCartney goes further and explains that the song is very similar to a specific Elvis song, though he avoids mentioning which particular one. Lewisohn writes that, though McCartney wrote the track on his own, it is heavily based on the melody of Elvis's "Tryin' to Get to You", which also includes the similar lyric, "[in] spite of all that I've been through." Musicologist Walter Everett agrees, writing that "its cadence comes close". Chris Ingram says it was "clearly inspired" by it, and John C. Winn says it was "fashioned after" it.

Everett writes most of the Beatles' earliest compositions were "thoroughly diatonic, grounded solidly in the major scale," and includes this song as an example.

The song is in the key of E and follows a standard I-I7-IV-V7-I-IV-I (E-E7-A-B7-E-A-E) progression. Here the harmonic development initially arises with the move (in bar 5 on "I'll do anything for you") to a subdominant or IV (a chord built on the 4th degree of the E major scale), but without the intervening range of chords prolonging harmonic tension that so characterised later Beatles songwriting. The resolution back to the tonic comes as the V chord (B7 in bar 8 on "you want me to") shifts to the I (E chord on "true to me"). Everett writes that the bridge "[culminates] in a stop-time retransition on a blue-note colored V." This "dramatic placement of stop time... at the end of the bridge" was something the Beatles saw regularly, including in "Come Go with Me", before they used it in "In Spite of All the Danger". They used the technique again in their later compositions "There's a Place" and "This Boy".

Recording
Around July 1958, the Quarrymen paid for a recording session at Percy Phillips' home in Kensington, Liverpool, recording a cover of Buddy Holly's "That'll Be the Day" and "In Spite of All the Danger". Lennon, McCartney and Harrison all played guitar, John "Duff" Lowe the piano and Colin Hanton the drums. Recording was achieved with a single microphone suspended from the ceiling, no volume balancing possible. Curtains and carpets were put in the downstairs living room to dampen the noise of traffic from the street outside. At nearly three and a half minutes, the song is much longer than most contemporary recordings. Lewisohn writes, "anecdotes have Percy Phillips waving his arms at them, hurrying them to a finish, because he could see the disc-cutting lathe reaching its ultimate point, almost at the center label."

The recording was cut directly to a single two sided shellac-on-metal 78-rpm disc. The disc likely cost the group 17s 6d. In a 1977 interview, Phillips recalled that the group initially only paid 15 shillings and someone returned a few days later with the remaining amount and to buy the record.

The only earlier recording of the Quarrymen is a reel-to-reel tape-recording made by an audience member on July 6, 1957, during the Quarrymen's last set for the 1957 Rose Queen garden fête at St. Peter's Church, Woolton, Liverpool.

Release and reception

With only one copy of recording made, the group members shared the disc for a week each. Lowe was the last to have it, keeping it for nearly 25 years. In 1981, he prepared to sell it at auction, but McCartney intervened and purchased it directly from him. McCartney had engineers restore as much of the record's sound quality as possible and then made approximately 50 copies of the single that he gave as personal gifts to family and friends. In 2004, Record Collector magazine named the original pressing the most valuable record in existence, estimating its worth at £100,000, with the 1981 copies made by McCartney coming in second on the list at £10,000 each.

"In Spite of All the Danger" was not released to the public until it appeared on the 1995 compilation album Anthology 1 along with "That'll Be the Day", though the former was shortened to 2:42 from its original 3:25 runtime.

Lewisohn describes the song as "a chugging and melodic country-flavored number". He further writes that the record "[is] not representative of their sound at any time other than this moment, which was a long way from the rough skiffle scuffle of tea-chest bass, washboard and banjo that was its start." Everett calls the song "Les Paul-like". Musicologist and writer Ian MacDonald writes that the song is "a dreary doo-wop pastiche" which "has little to recommend it".

Performances
McCartney played the song throughout his 2004 Summer and 2005 US tours and would continue to perform it through his 2016–17 One on One, 2018-19 Freshen Up and 2022 Got Back tours. A recording of McCartney's concert at The Cavern Club in 2018, which featured a performance of the song with his touring band, was broadcast on Christmas Day 2020 on BBC One.

The song's recording was depicted by The Nowhere Boys in the 2009 biopic Nowhere Boy. The band also perform "That'll Be the Day," although it was cut from the film and is available as a deleted scene on the DVD and Blu-ray releases. These versions of the two songs can be heard on the film's soundtrack.

McCartney performed the song at Glastonbury on 25 June 2022.

Personnel 
According to MacDonald, except where noted:

John Lennon – lead vocal, rhythm guitar
Paul McCartney – backing vocal, rhythm guitar
George Harrison – lead guitar, backing vocal
John "Duff" Lowe – piano
Colin Hanton – drums

Notes

Citations

Sources

Further reading

External links 
Alan W. Pollock's Notes On "In Spite of All the Danger"
The Beatles Bible: In Spite Of All The Danger
TheBeatleSource: History of The Beatles' recordings, performances, and personnel

The Quarrymen songs
1995 songs
Songs written by George Harrison
Songs written by Paul McCartney
The Beatles Anthology